Mike Haluchak (born November 28, 1949 in Concord, CA) is an American football coach. He served as the linebackers coach for the Oakland Raiders from 2009 until 2010.

College career
Haluchak played college football at the University of Southern California.  He went on to get a master's degree in secondary education from California Lutheran University.

Coaching career
Haluchak has coached at the college and pro level since 1976. He's had stints with the San Diego Chargers, Cincinnati Bengals, Washington Redskins, New York Giants, St. Louis Rams, Jacksonville Jaguars, and Cleveland Browns.

Was hired to coach the linebackers of the Oakland Raiders in February 2009. He fired from the position by new head coach Hue Jackson in January 2011 after the 2010 season came to a close.

Coaching Timeline
 San Diego Chargers (1986-1991) LB
 Cincinnati Bengals (1992-1993) LB
 Washington Redskins (1994-1996) LB
 New York Giants (1997-1999) LB
 St. Louis Rams (2000-2002) LB
 Jacksonville Jaguars (2003-2004) LB
 Cleveland Browns (2005-2008) LB
 Oakland Raiders (2009-2010) LB

References

External links
Bio

1949 births
Living people
Cleveland Browns coaches
USC Trojans football players
Jacksonville Jaguars coaches
New York Giants coaches
Oakland Raiders coaches
San Diego Chargers coaches
St. Louis Rams coaches
Washington Redskins coaches
Players of American football from California
People from Concord, California
Sportspeople from the San Francisco Bay Area
California Lutheran University alumni
Cincinnati Bengals coaches